Jose Nandhikkara CMI (born 16 February 1964) is a professor of philosophy at Dharmaram Vidya Kshetram and Christ University, both in Bangalore, India.
He is the author of several books including Environmental Interface: Literature, Law, Science, Philosophy and Ethical Interface: Literature, Economics, Politics, Religion.

Birth and education
Jose Nandhikkara was born on 16 February 1964. He joined the Carmelites of Mary Immaculate (C.M.I.), Devamatha province, Thrissur. He studied Bachelor of Philosophy (1986) and Bachelor of Theology (1993) at Dharmaram Vidya Kshetram, Bengaluru, after which, on 1 January 1994, he was ordained a priest in the Syro-Malabar Church. He did his Licentiate in Systematic Philosophy (1997) at Gregorian University, Rome Italy. His Licentiate thesis was “Natural Religion according to J. H. Newman.” In 1999, he did MA in Philosophy and Theology at Oxford University, UK. His thesis title was “Religion according to Ludwig Wittgenstein.” He earned a PhD in Philosophy at Warwick University, UK, in 2004. His dissertation title was "Being Human from a Religious Point of View after Wittgenstein."

References

1964 births
Living people